Salakót is a traditional lightweight headgear from the Philippines that is commonly used during pre-colonial era up to the present day, used for protection against the sun and rain. Every ethnolinguistic group in the archipelago has their own variant, but they are all usually dome-shaped or cone-shaped and can range in size from having very wide brims to being almost helmet-like. They are made from various materials including bamboo, rattan, nito ferns, and bottle gourd. The tip of the crown commonly has a spiked or knobbed finial made of metal or wood. It is held in place by an inner headband and a chinstrap. The salakot hat also influenced the pith helmet used by European colonizers. Salakot or also spelled as salacot in Spanish and salacco in French is the direct precursor to the pith helmet (also called salacot in Spanish and French) widely used by European military forces in the colonial era.

Description
Salakot is a general term for a range of related traditional headgear used by virtually all ethnic groups of the Philippines. It is usually dome-shaped or cone-shaped, but various other styles also exist, including versions with dome-shaped, cone-shaped, or flat crowns with a flat or gently sloping brim. The tip of the crown commonly has a spiked or knobbed finial made of metal or wood (sometimes with horsehair or feather plumes). The rim may also feature tassels of beads, feathers, or metal ornaments. They can range in size from having very wide brims to being almost helmet-like. It is held in place by an inner headband (baat) and a chinstrap. It was widely used in the Philippines until the 20th century when it was largely replaced by western-style hats.

Salakot can be made from various materials including bamboo, rattan, nito, bottle gourd, buri straw, nipa leaves, pandan leaves, carabao horn, and tortoiseshell. The way they are manufactured and ornamented varies by ethnic group. Salakot can also have named subtypes based on the material used. Among Tagalogs for example, salakot made from split bamboo were known as tinipas, while salakot made from dried bottle gourd were known as takukom. They can also be coated with resin to make them waterproof.

Most salakot were simple and were made from cheap materials. These were worn as protection against the sun and rain by farmers and fishermen. More elaborate ones, made from rarer materials with inlaid ornaments and tassels, were treated as precious heirloom objects, handed down from generation to generation. They were status symbols and could be used as currency, as collateral for a promise, or as gifts.

Some salakot also had cloth overlays (which are commonly decorated with elaborate embroidery) or have linings which can have pockets used for storing valuables and money, as well as tobacco or betel leaves.

Variants

The name salakot is derived from the version of the headgear from the Tagalog and Kapampangan people. The names of similar headgear in other ethnic groups of the Philippines include:

Talugong - salakot of the Ivatan people. It is worn by men paired with a vest of voyavoy palm leaves called kana-i or kanayi. Women, in turn, wear a straw cowl called a vakul.
Hallidung - also known as lido, are the salakot of the Ifugao people. Usually made from twilled rattan or bamboo and covered in a coating of resin to make it waterproof.
Kalugung - are the salakot of the Kalinga people. They were usually made of rattan and nito, or from light wood. They were either shaped like a dome or a gently sloping cone.
Kattukong - also known as katukong, tukong, or tabungaw, are the salakot of the Ilocano and Tinguian people, usually made from dried gourd reinforced with nito woven at the rim.
Sadok or Sarok  - refers to the different salakot designs of the Visayan, Bikolano, and Mandaya people. 
Cebuano Sarok - Also known as Takokong in Sialo-dialect Cebuano. Features a lightweight and design-central design. It is  made of woven stalks from the nito plant (Lygodium spp.) and/or dried leaves or bamboo, creating a patterned net-like structure, with a signature six-petal flower design made from lighter leaves or thin bamboo wood plates secured at the very top of the hat.
Bicolano Sadok - This salakot is made from anahaw leaves and bamboo and either features a pointed shape resembling Mt Mayon, or a rounded shape with an inner attached hat fitted around the wearer's head. This is also the style of salakot worn in Leyte and Sorsogon.
Mandaya Sadok - The Mandaya sadok is uniquely elongated from front to back, and are often decorated with feathers, tassels, and beads.
Saro - are the salakot of the Tausug people
Saruk - are the salakot of the Yakan and Sama-Bajau people made from plaited rattan, nito and cotton. The Yakan version is characteristically dome-shaped with a wide crown. Both men and women can wear the saruk. Among men, they are worn over the traditional pis syabit headscarves.
Sayap - also known as binalano or tapisan, are the salakot of the Maguindanao people. They are made from twilled bamboo and nito.
S'laong - are the salakot of T'boli people. They are gender-specific. Men wore the shallow conical s'laong naf, made from bamboo and rattan with geometric black-and-white designs. Women wore the wide-brimmed s'laong kinibang which was made from bamboo covered with a cloth lining that distinctively hang down the sides and back, usually decorated with bead fringes.

History

Salakot is part of the pre-colonial culture of the Philippines. The earliest record of salakot was in 1521 when Antonio Pigafetta of Ferdinand Magellan's expedition described a "queen who wore a large hat of palm leaves in the manner of parasol, with a crown about it of the same leaves like the tiara of the pope; and she never goes any place without such one."

During the 19th century in the Spanish colonial era, the salakot were worn as status symbols by members of the aristocratic class (the Principalía) as part of the barong tagalog ensemble. 

These Spanish-era salakot were made from prized materials like tortoiseshell and elaborately decorated with gems and precious metals like silver, or, at times, gold. They also commonly had long ornate spikes tipped with horsehair, or have coins or pendants that hung around the rim. Many depictions of gobernadorcillos and cabezas de barangay would portray these colonial public functionaries as wearing ornate salakot.

Pith helmets

Salakot were also widely used as military sun hats in the colonial-era Philippines by both native and Spanish troops in the Spanish Army and the Guardia Civil (where they were known as salacot). They were commonly cloth-covered. This was copied first by the French colonial troops in Indochina who called it the  salacco. British and Dutch troops in nearby regions followed suit and the salakot became a common headgear for colonial forces in the mid-19th century.

The salakot was most widely adopted by the British Empire. They began experimenting with derivative designs in search of a lightweight hat for troops serving in tropical regions. This led to a succession of designs ultimately resulting in the "Colonial pattern" pith helmet.

French marines also introduced the early version of the salacco to the French Antilles, where it became the salako.

Cultural significance
The salakot is a common symbol for Filipino identity, often worn by the National personification Juan dela Cruz along with a barong tagalog. The kattukung made from bottle gourd is also commonly associated with the 18th-century Ilocano revolutionary leader Diego Silang.

In 2012, Teofilo Garcia of Abra in Luzon, expert artisan of a special kind of salakot made of bottle gourd (Lagenaria siceraria) was awarded by the National Commission for Culture and the Arts with the "Gawad sa Manlilikha ng Bayan" (National Living Treasures Award) for his dedication to the traditional craft of making gourd salakot, affirming the status of the salakot as one of the intangible cultural heritage of the Philippines under the traditional craftsmanship category.

Gallery

See also

 Buntal hat
 Kasa
 Asian conical hat
 History of the Philippines (1521–1898)
 Barong tagalog

References

Philippine headgear
Pointed hats
Filipino nobility
Philippine handicrafts